Hypatia is a lunar impact crater along the northwest edge of Sinus Asperitatis, a bay on the southwest edge of Mare Tranquillitatis. It was named after Egyptian mathematician Hypatia of Alexandria. The nearest crater with an eponym is Alfraganus to the west-southwest. However, farther to the south-southeast, across the lunar mare, is the prominent crater Theophilus.

Hypatia is an asymmetrical formation with a rugged, irregular outer rim cut through in several places by narrow clefts. It is generally longer along an axis running to the north-northwest, with the widest outward bulge occurring on the west side at the northern end. It resembles a merger of several crater formations with a common interior floor. Attached to the exterior rim along the southwest is the satellite crater Hypatia A, a more symmetrical, bowl-shaped crater.

Rimae Hypatia
About 70 kilometers to the north of Hypatia is a system of linear rilles designated Rimae Hypatia, running about 180 kilometers across the Mare Tranquillitatis, and generally following a course to the south-southeast. The part of the rilles close to the crater Moltke was informally called U.S. Highway 1 by the Apollo 10 and Apollo 11 crews.

Satellite craters
By convention, these features are identified on lunar maps by placing the letter on the side of the crater midpoint closest to Hypatia.

References

 
 
 
 
 
 
 
 
 
 
 

Impact craters on the Moon